Gojčin Crnojević (1398–d. after 1451) was a Lord of Zeta, initially as a vassal of the Serbian Despotate until he revolted against Despot Stefan Lazarević. He disappeared from sources in 1451. 

Gojčin was the second son of Đurađ Đurašević of the Crnojević noble family. His father and uncle Aleksa were the lords of the territory of Paštrovići (Luštica and hills above Kotor and Budva) during the reign of Balša III (r. 1403–1421). His brothers were Đurašin, Stefanica and another one with an unknown name and historical role. He was mentioned for the first time in 1431. He initially had the title of knez, and later vojvoda. In the beginning, he was the leading character among the brothers. The Crnojevići, initially vassals of the Serbian Despotate, revolted against the Despot; Gojčin was particularly participating. He held good relations with the Republic of Ragusa and became its citizen in July 1444. He and his two younger brothers defected to Venice after their older brother concluded his alliance with Stjepan Vukčić Kosača.  He had a son, Aleksandar ("Aleksa" or "Leka").

Annotations
His given name is also spelled Kojčin (Којчин). In .

References

Sources
 
 

15th-century Serbian nobility
Gojcin
1398 births
1451 deaths
People of the Serbian Despotate